Teplice nad Metují is a town in Náchod District in the Hradec Králové Region of the Czech Republic. It has about 1,600 inhabitants.

Administrative parts

Villages and hamlets of Bohdašín, Dědov, Dolní Teplice, Horní Teplice, Javor, Lachov, Libná, Skály and Zdoňov are administrative parts of Teplice nad Metují.

Geography
It is located on the border with Poland. It lies in the Broumov Highlands, in the Broumovsko Protected Landscape Area. The river Metuje flows through the town.

Teplice nad Metují is known for the Adršpach-Teplice Rocks, a set of sandstone formations protected as a national nature reserve.

History
The predecessors of Teplice nad Metují and villages in the municipality were the castles Střmen and Skály, built for protection of a trade route in the 13th century, and small settlements around them. The first written mention of Teplice located below Střmen is from 1362. The Střmen castle was demolished in 1447. From 1614 to 1848, Teplice was divided into Horní Teplice and Dolní Teplice ("Lower" and "Upper" Teplice) and had different owners.

During the German occupation (World War II), the occupiers operated the E431 forced labour subcamp of the Stalag VIII-B/344 prisoner-of-war camp in Dolní Teplice.

Demographics

Transport
There is the road border crossing with Poland Zdoňov / Łączna and the pedestrian border crossing Libná / Chełmsko Śląskie.

Sights
The Church of Saint Lawrence was built in Baroque style in 1724. The pilgrimage Church of Our Lady Help of Christians was built in 1754–1763 and has a unique wooden hermitage.

The Horní Castle was built in the Renaissance style in 1599 and today serves as the municipal office. The early Baroque Dolní Castle from 1664 houses a retirement home.

On the Čáp hill, there is an observation tower.

Notable people
Josef Tichatschek (1807–1886), opera singer

Twin towns – sister cities

Teplice nad Metují is twinned with:
 Jaworzyna Śląska, Poland

References

External links

Cities and towns in the Czech Republic
Populated places in Náchod District
Czech Republic–Poland border crossings